Radiochromic film is a type of self-developing film typically used in the testing and characterisation of radiographic equipment such as CT scanners and radiotherapy linacs. The film contains a dye which changes colour when exposed to ionising radiation, allowing the level of exposure and beam profile to be characterised. Unlike x-ray film no developing process is required and results can be obtained almost instantly, while it is insensitive to visible light (making handling easier).

Mechanism
For medical dosimetry "gafchromic dosimetry film (...) is arguably the most widely used commercial product". Several types of gafchromic film are marketed with differing properties. One type, MD-55, is made up of layers of polyester substrate with active emulsion layers adhered (approximately 16μm thick). The active layer consists of polycrystalline, substituted-diacetylene and the colour change occurs due to "progressive 1,4-trans additions as polyconjugations along the ladder-like polymer chains".

Usage
Radiochromic films have been in general use since the late 1960s, although the general principle has been known about since the 19th century.

Profiling
Radiochromic film can provide high spatial resolution information about the distribution of radiation. Depending on the scanning technique, sub-millimetre resolution can be achieved.

Dosimetry
Unlike many other types of radiation detector, radiochromic film can be used for absolute dosimetry where information about absorbed dose is obtained directly. It is typically scanned, for example using a standard flat bed scanner, to provide accurate quantification of the optical density and therefore degree of exposure. Gafchromic film has been shown to provide measurements accurate to 2% over doses of 0.2–100 Gray (Gy).

References

Further reading

Medical physics
Ionising radiation detectors
X-ray instrumentation